Netball Switzerland was founded in 2009 by a group of volunteers to  promote the game of Netball within Switzerland. Netball Switzerland changed its name to Swiss Netball and joined the INF as a full member (International Netball Federation)in 2011. Switzerland was ranked on the INF World rankings - www.netball.org.

Development 
The Under 17 team first represented Switzerland at the  European Netball championships in 2010. The staff driving elite level netball programme launched the Cadre d'Espoir in 2011-12 with the aim of creating a player performance pathway.

Juniors 
Swiss Netball is dedicated to developing netball both in public schools in Switzerland through the Prête-pour-net initiative. Swiss Netball supports the development of competitions in schools and clubs as well as supporting the start up process for new clubs.

Seniors 
The Swiss Netball Nationalkader/Cadre national was established in 2012. A squad of 15 represented Switzerland at Netball Europe World Ranking Tournament in Gibraltar, May 2012. Switzerland achieved World Ranking at the tournament alongside Republic of Ireland, Israel, Malta and Gibraltar. In May 2013 the team represented Switzerland at the Netball Europe Open Championships in Aberdeen. Switzerland won the Silver Medal in the Development Section of the Championships and Player of the Tournament.

Annual Tournament 
The first annual Netball Switzerland tournament took place in May at International School of Lausanne (ISL). It has grown from four local teams in 2008 to two tournaments, one in May for Junior's and one later in the year called " The Peppermill Challenge" for Seniors.

References

External links 

Swit
Sports organizations established in 2008
2008 establishments in Switzerland
Netball
Netball in Switzerland
Organisations based in Geneva
Swi